The 1972 KFK competitions in Ukraine were part of the 1972 Soviet KFK competitions that were conducted in the Soviet Union. It was 9th season of the KFK in Ukraine since its introduction in 1964.

First stage

Group 1

Group 2

Group 3

Group 4

Group 5

Group 6

Final

Promotion
None of KFK teams were promoted to the 1973 Soviet Second League, Zone 1.
 none

However, to the Class B were promoted following teams that did not participate in the KFK competitions:
 none

References

Ukrainian Football Amateur League seasons
4
Soviet
Soviet
football